1944 Günter, provisional designation , is an asteroid from the inner regions of the asteroid belt, approximately 5 kilometers in diameter.

It was discovered on 14 September 1925, by German astronomer Karl Reinmuth at Heidelberg Observatory in southern Germany, and named after the discoverer's son, Günter Reinmuth.

Orbit and classification 

Günter orbits the Sun in the inner main-belt at a distance of 1.7–2.8 AU once every 3 years and 4 months (1,224 days). Its orbit has an eccentricity of 0.24 and an inclination of 5° with respect to the ecliptic. As no precoveries were taken and no prior identifications were made, the body's observation arc begins at Heidelberg, one night after its official discovery observation.

Physical characteristics 

According to the survey carried out by NASA's Wide-field Infrared Survey Explorer with its subsequent NEOWISE mission, Günter measures 4.9 kilometers in diameter, and its surface has an albedo of 0.117. As of 2017, its composition, rotation period and shape remain unknown.

Naming 

This minor planet was named by Karl Reinmuth after his son, Günter Reinmuth. The official  was published by the Minor Planet Center on 18 April 1977.

References

External links 
 Asteroid Lightcurve Database (LCDB), query form (info )
 Dictionary of Minor Planet Names, Google books
 Asteroids and comets rotation curves, CdR – Observatoire de Genève, Raoul Behrend
 Discovery Circumstances: Numbered Minor Planets (1)-(5000) – Minor Planet Center
 
 

001944
Discoveries by Karl Wilhelm Reinmuth
Named minor planets
19250914